Lü Jie (English name Amy Lu) is a Cantonese actress and model active in Mainland China and Hong Kong. 

Lü Jie graduated from Zhixin High School in Guangzhou, Guangdon, China and the Guangzhou Institute of Foreign Languages with a degree in French.

She started her career as an advertisement and TV commercial model in 1998. She later moved into sitcoms and TV drama in early 2002. She played roles in various Hong Kong box office films including Kung Fu Football. Notable collaborators included Lau Ching Wan and Kent Cheng.

Filmography

TV series 
2001: 《网络情人》 " Internet Lover " as Xiao Xiao
2002: 《柴米新人类》" Chaimi New Human " as GIGI
2003: 《功夫足球》" Kung Fu Football " decorated with beads
2004: 《伙头智多星》" Man, Wisdom, Many Stars " as a psychiatrist
2006:  《美梦人生》"A Dream of Life " decorated with hoarfrost
2007: 《新不了情》 " New Love " as Wan Shaoling
2008: 《外地媳妇本地郎》" Foreign Wife and Local Lang " as Tang Zhiruo
2008: 《广州人家》" Guangzhou People " as Chen Jiamei
2010: 《电视台的故事》" The Story of TV Station "

Films
2003: The End of Counterfeit Banknotes
2004: Itchy Heart as Mable
2005: Backup Sweetheart as Helen
2006: Love Boxing as Macy
2006: Heavenly Mission as Lu Wenli
2007: Exodus
2008: The opening film of the Hong Kong Film Festival
2010: The King of Gun King
2012: Marrying Mr. Perfect as the hostess
2012: Naked Soldier

See also
 List of movies set in Hong Kong
 Cinema of China

References

External links

 
 
 
 
 
 
 

Living people
Chinese female models
1984 births
Hong Kong female models
Actresses from Guangdong
People from Zhaoqing